Statistics of Football Clubs Association Championship in the 1921–22 season. Only the Athens-Piraeus championship was held.

Athens-Piraeus Football Clubs Association

*Withdrawal.

External Links
1921-22 championship

 

Panhellenic Championship seasons
1921 in association football
1922 in association football
1921–22 in Greek football